Owl Creek Bridge may refer to:

"An Occurrence at Owl Creek Bridge", a short story by Ambrose Bierce
An Occurrence at Owl Creek Bridge (film), a French film adaptation of Bierce's short story, originally titled La Rivière du Hibou (and eventually aired as an episode of The Twilight Zone)
EFP Bridge over Owl Creek

Disambiguation pages